Streptomyces reniochalinae is a bacterium species from the genus of Streptomyces.

See also 
 List of Streptomyces species

References 

reniochalinae
Bacteria described in 2019